Albania established diplomatic ties with France in the years following the Paris Peace Conference of 1919. France had played an important role in the survival of the Albanian State. In 1916, it established a military protectorate in the region of Korçë. After World War II, it was the first Western country to reinstate its diplomatic mission in Tirana, doing so in 1945. France also participated in the successful ALBA operation led by Italy in the spring of 1997, which helped restore public order and organize legislative elections in the summer of that year.

List of diplomatic representatives of Albania to France (1922–present)

References 

 
France
Albania